Petr Straka (born June 15, 1992) is a Czech professional ice hockey player currently playing under contract for HC Verva Litvínov in the Czech Extraliga (ELH).

Playing career
Straka was selected by the Columbus Blue Jackets in the 2nd round (55th overall) of the 2010 NHL Entry Draft. However, the Blue Jackets did not sign Straka to an entry level contract and he was not selected in the 2012 NHL Entry Draft. Straka became a free agent and on April 11, 2013, was signed to a three-year entry-level contract by the Philadelphia Flyers. In the 2014–15 season, Straka was recalled from AHL affiliate, the Lehigh Valley Phantoms and made his NHL debut on January 27, 2015. He appeared in 3 games with the Flyers, recording two assists.

On November 12, 2016, Straka was traded by the Flyers to the New Jersey Devils in exchange for a conditional seventh-round pick. He was re-assigned to AHL affiliate, the Albany Devils, for the duration of the 2016–17 season, contributing with 4 goals and 13 points in 38 games.

As an impending free agent and with limited NHL opportunity, Straka opted to return to hometown club, in signing a one-year deal with HC Plzeň of the Czech Extraliga on June 20, 2017.

Career statistics

Regular season and playoffs

International

Notable awards and honours
Quebec Major Junior Hockey League 
 RDS Cup (Rookie of the Year) — 2009–10
 Michel Bergeron Trophy (Offensive Rookie of the Year) — 2009–10
 QMJHL All-Rookie Team — 2009–10

Canadian Hockey League
Canadian Major Junior All-Rookie Team (2010)

References

External links

1992 births
Sportspeople from Plzeň
Columbus Blue Jackets draft picks
Czech ice hockey right wingers
Lehigh Valley Phantoms players
Living people
HC Plzeň players
Rimouski Océanic players
Adirondack Phantoms players
Philadelphia Flyers players
Albany Devils players
HC Dukla Jihlava players
HC Litvínov players
Czech expatriate ice hockey players in Canada
Czech expatriate ice hockey players in the United States